Tiziano Dall'Antonia (born 26 July 1983 in Vittorio Veneto) is an Italian professional road bicycle racer, who rides for UCI Professional Continental .

Career achievements

Major results

2005
2nd Overall Tour de Berlin
2nd Coppa Citta di Asti
3rd Overall Triptyque des Barrages
4th Individual Road Race Mediterranean Games
6th Trofeo Zsšdi
2006
10th Doha GP
2007
3rd Overall Tour de Luxembourg
1st Young rider classification
7th Grand Prix de Rennes
10th Overall Niedersachsen-Rundfahrt
10th Gran Premio della Costa Etruschi
2008
3rd Overall Circuit de la Sarthe
10th Trofeo Laigueglia
2010
1st Stage 4 (TTT) Giro d'Italia
1st Stage 1b (TTT) Settimana internazionale di Coppi e Bartali
3rd Gran Premio Nobili Rubinetterie
7th Giro del Friuli
2011
9th Tour de Mumbai II

Grand Tour general classification results timeline

References

External links

1983 births
Living people
People from Vittorio Veneto
Italian male cyclists
Cyclists from the Province of Treviso
Competitors at the 2005 Mediterranean Games
Mediterranean Games competitors for Italy